Meritas was a company that operated 10 for-profit college-preparatory schools. The majority of schools are located in the United States, with 3 additional schools in China, Switzerland, and Mexico. It was owned by Sterling Capital Partners, a private equity company.

History

Founded in 2005 by Philip E. Morgaman, who served as Chairman and Chief Executive until 2008 and remained Chairman until 2009 when he sold his interest in the company. He was succeeded as CEO by Jonathan (Mac) Gamse and later as Chairman by Christopher Hoehn-Saric. At the time of this transition, Meritas had grown from a concept to 19 campuses with approximately 14,000 students. Meritas has purchased multiple schools worldwide.  Its first acquisition, in 2005, was North Broward Preparatory School, in Coconut Creek, Florida.  Collège du Léman, located in Geneva, Switzerland was the next school to join the Meritas family in 2006.

As of April 27, 2015, Meritas has sold several of their acquired schools to Nord Anglia Education (NAE) including, North Broward Prep, Collège du Léman, Léman International, The Village School, Windermere Prep, Instituto San Roberto. It is unclear whether the remaining Meritas schools will be acquired by NAE.

Schools and Locations

 Léman Manhattan Preparatory School located in Manhattan, New York
 Collège du Léman located in Geneva, Switzerland
 Instituto San Roberto two campuses located in Valle Alto (Monterrey) and San Augustín, Mexico
 Lake Mary Preparatory School located in Lake Mary, Florida
 Léman International School located in Chengdu, China
 North Broward Preparatory School located in Coconut Creek, Florida
 Rancho Solano Preparatory School located in Scottsdale, Arizona
 Henderson International School located in Henderson, Nevada
 The Village School located in Houston, Texas
 Windermere Preparatory School located in Windermere, Florida

References

External links
 www.meritas.net

Education companies of the United States
Education companies established in 2005
International school associations